Věrovany is a municipality and village in Olomouc District in the Olomouc Region of the Czech Republic. It has about 1,400 inhabitants.

Administrative parts
Villages of Nenakonice and Rakodavy are administrative parts of Věrovany.

Notable people
Otakar Bystřina (1861–1931), writer

References

Villages in Olomouc District